B. pulchella may refer to:

 Banksia pulchella, the teasel banksia, a shrub species found in Western Australia
 Biplex pulchella, a sea snail species